Donna Floyd Fales (née Floyd; born October 14, 1940) is a former American amateur tennis player.  She was ranked in the Top 10 in the United States from 1960 to 1963, and from 1965 to 1966.

Biography
She was born in Atlanta, Georgia and moved to Arlington, Virginia at the age of 13. During her playing career she lived in New York City and since 1968 in Miami, Florida.

A graduate of the College of William and Mary, she won her first national junior title at age 15. She captured the singles title at the second national collegiate tournament for women in 1959.

She played on the U.S. Wightman Cup team in 1963, and later was captain of the Wightman and Federation Cup teams.

Fales won the U.S. Clay Court singles title in 1962, and was the U.S. mixed doubles champion in 1966.
At the tournaments in Cincinnati and Canada, she won the singles title at Cincinnati in 1959 and at Canada in 1960. She also won the doubles title in Canada in 1960.

Fales has been inducted into Women's Collegiate Tennis Hall of Fame (1997), the Virginia All Sports Hall of Fame (1997), the Florida Tennis Association Hall of Fame (1987), the William & Mary Athletic Hall of Fame, and the Virginia Sports Hall of Fame & Museum (1997).

Grand Slam finals

Doubles (1 runner-up)

Mixed doubles (1 title)

References

External links
 
 
 
 From Club Court to Center Court by Phillip S. Smith (2008 Edition)

1940 births
Living people
American female tennis players
United States National champions (tennis)
William & Mary Tribe women's tennis players
Place of birth missing (living people)
Grand Slam (tennis) champions in mixed doubles